"Like I Used To" is a song recorded by American singer Tinashe. It was released for digital download and streaming by RCA Records on July 13, 2018. The song was written by Tinashe alongside the producers of the song, Smash David and Hitmaka. The song was the lead single off Tinashe's now-scrapped fourth studio album Nashe.

Composition
"Liked I Used to" is a pop-R&B song described as "brisk and wistful", with a "mixture of sensuality and electronic music". It runs for 3 minutes and 8 seconds. The production being trap-influenced with a "sleek, shimmery beat", Tinashe talks about the breakup of her previous relationship with NBA Ben Simmons.

Critical reception
Billboard's Alessandra Rincón calls "Like I Used To" Tinashe "asserting" her "newfound independence". Michael Love Michael of Paper Magazine describes the song as a "breakup jam". Alex Zidel from HotNewHipHop writes "Too busy in her bag to still care about the past, the only thing in Tinashe's future is money and she's making that clear on 'Like I Used To' [...] and gives us the first taste at the direction Tinashe is headed in, speaking her mind and possibly divulging how she really feels about her relationship with Simmons."

Artwork
The cover shows a Polaroid picture Tinashe popping a champagne bottle, while a red up-side down smile covers Tinashe's face along with the words "XO Nashe".

Charts

References

2018 singles
2018 songs
Pop ballads
RCA Records singles
Songs written by Tinashe
Tinashe songs
Songs written by Smash David
Songs written by Hitmaka
Song recordings produced by Yung Berg